The Drunkard, is a 1950 Greek drama film written and directed by George Tzavellas. It was the highest grossing Greek film in 1950, selling 304,438 tickets.

Plot
Haralambos Lardis (Orestis Makris) is a poor cobbler in Plaka who has become a drunkard and the laughing stock of his neighborhood after the death of his son during the Greco-Italian War. His daughter, Anna, (Billy Konstantopoulou) falls in love with the son of her boss Alec Bakas (Dimitris Horn) and they plan to marry. Her father attempts to overcome his addiction not wanting to embarrass himself in front of the rich family of his future son-in-law, but gets drunk before meeting the Bakas family. Realizing that he is an obstacle to his daughter's happiness, he commits suicide bringing the two families closer.

Cast
Orestis Makris ..... Haralambos Lardis
Dimitris Horn ..... Alec Bakas
Billy Konstantopoulou ..... Anna Lardi
Athanasia Moustaka ..... grandmother
Nikos Rizos ..... pub customer
Thanos Tzeneralis ..... doctor
Anna Kyriakou ..... Betty Baboulia
Katia Linda ..... Kaiti
Rena Stratigou ..... Dolly

Notes
"The Drunkard" was the first big commercial success in Greece. Finos Film established itself as the dominant film production company in Greece. With his iconic portrayal of the drunkard, Orestis Makris became one of the most important actors of Greek cinema.

External links

Greek drama films
1950 films
1950 drama films
Films directed by George Tzavellas
Finos Film films
Greek black-and-white films
1950s Greek-language films